Agama bottegi, also known commonly  as the Somali agama, is a species of lizard in the family Agamidae. The species is endemic to Somalia.

Etymology
The specific name, bottegi, is in honor of Italian explorer Vittorio Bottego.

Habitat
The preferred natural habitat of A. bottegi is shrubland.

Description

Reproduction
A. bottegi is oviparous.

References

Further reading
Boulenger GA (1897). "Concluding Report on the late Capt. Bottego's collection of Reptiles and Batrachian's from Somaliland and British East Africa". Annali del Museo Civico di Storia Naturale di Genova, Serie Seconda [= Second Series] 18: 715–723 + Plates IX–X. (Agama bottegi, new species, p. 717 + Plate IX, figures 1 & 1a).
Lanza B (1978). "On some new or interesting East African amphibians and reptiles". Monitore Zoologico Italiano, Supplemento 10 (14): 229–297. (Agama bottegi, pp. 276, 278 + Figure 41). (in English, with an abstract in Italian).
Lanza B (1990). "Amphibians and reptiles of the Somali Democratic Republic" check list and biogeography". Biogeographia 14: 407–465. (Agama bottegi, p. 419).
Wagner P, Leaché A, Mazuch T, Böhme W (2013). "Additions to the lizard diversity of the Horn of Africa: Two new species in the Agama spinosa group". Amphibia-Reptilia 34 (3): 363–387.

Agama (genus)
Reptiles described in 1897
Taxa named by George Albert Boulenger